Michael B. Hall is an American inorganic and theoretical chemist. He obtained his B.S. degree in Chemistry from Juniata College in 1966, and his Ph.D. with Richard F. Fenske at the University of Wisconsin–Madison in 1971.  Hall is currently a professor at Texas A&M University.

Hall was involved in the development of the Fenske-Hall method, an ab initio molecular orbital method, as well as the Couty-Hall modification to the LANL2DZ basis sets.

References

Living people
Year of birth missing (living people)
Juniata College alumni
University of Wisconsin–Madison alumni
21st-century American chemists
Inorganic chemists
Theoretical chemists
Texas A&M University faculty